The Mott Haven Herald is a monthly newspaper that covers the Mott Haven, Port Morris, and Melrose sections of the Bronx. Founded in the spring of 2009, the Herald's news stories range from crime, arts, entertainment, and politics to the activities of local people and institutions. The front page appears in color, but most photos inside the newspaper appear in black and white.

The newspaper's editor is Joe Hirsch. The reporters are students at the Craig Newmark Graduate School of Journalism at the City University of New York.

The Heralds logo, an American Indian aiming his bow and arrow, is based on a weather vane fabricated at the Jordan Mott Ironworks, which gave the neighborhood its name. The newspaper's partner publication is the Hunts Point Express, which is also edited by Hirsch and staffed by students from Hunter College. The Herald was founded by Bernard L. Stein, former editor of the Riverdale Press, as was The Express, which began publication in 2006.

References

External links 
Mott Haven Herald

Newspapers published in the Bronx
Newspapers established in 2009
2009 establishments in New York City
Monthly newspapers
Mott Haven, Bronx
Port Morris, Bronx
Melrose, Bronx